In baseball, a triple is a hit in which the batter advances to third base in one play, with neither the benefit of a fielding error nor another runner being put out on a fielder's choice.  Triples were more common in baseball's dead-ball era, when teams relied more on stolen bases and hit and run plays than on the home run.  More distant fences in old ballparks, such as Pittsburgh's Forbes Field and Detroit's Tiger Stadium, also produced fewer home runs and more triples on well-hit balls. As a result, most of the players on this list have been retired for decades. Only two players in the top 50 all-time career triples leaders played after WWII (Stan Musial and Roberto Clemente), and there are no players in the top 50 who played after 1972.

In 2006, the Hardball Times lamented the decline of the 100-triple player, although three have joined the list since that time. Fangraphs, a statistical website, likewise noted the lack of modern 100-triple hitters in 2013. Of the 162 Major League Baseball players who have hit 100 or more triples, 69 are members of Baseball's Hall of Fame.

Hall of Famer Sam Crawford of the Detroit Tigers holds the Major League Baseball triples record, with 309. Second to him is his Tigers teammate, Ty Cobb, with 297, the American League record. Honus Wagner is third with 252, the National League record.  Jake Beckley (243), Roger Connor (233), Tris Speaker (222), Fred Clarke (220), and Dan Brouthers (205) are the only other players to have hit at least 200 triples.  Only triples hit during the regular season are included in the totals (George Brett, Rafael Furcal, and Derek Jeter are tied for the record in post-season triples, with five).

Jim O'Rourke was the first player to reach the 100-triple mark, doing so with the New York Giants in 1886. With Kenny Lofton's retirement after the 2007 season, 2008 was the first season since 1885 in which no active player had more than 100 triples. Carl Crawford hit his 100th triple in 2010, becoming the only active player on the list at that time.  José Reyes became the latest player to reach the 100 triple plateau, doing so on April 8, 2012.

When Reyes retired after the 2018 season, Major League Baseball once again had no active player with 100 career triples.  The current active career triples leader is Dexter Fowler, who has 82 career triples as of the end of the 2021 season.



Key

Leaders

Stats updated as of the end of the 2022 season.

See also

Yutaka Fukumoto – the player with the most career triples in Nippon Professional Baseball

Notes

References

External links
Baseball Reference
Major League Baseball

Triples over 100
Major League Baseball statistics